Sudanese or Sudanic may refer to:
pertaining to the country of Sudan
the people of Sudan, see Demographics of Sudan
pertaining to Sudan (region)
Sudanic languages
Sudanic race, subtype of the Africoid racial category

See also
Al-Sudani (disambiguation)
Sudanese Civil War (disambiguation)

Language and nationality disambiguation pages